The Journal of Aerosol Science is a peer-reviewed academic journal covering the study of aerosols in multiple disciplines, including physics, chemistry, and engineering. It was established in 1970 and is published thirteen times per year. It is published by Elsevier in association with the European Aerosol Assembly. The editors-in-chief are Christopher J Hogan (University of Minnesota, Twin Cities, Minneapolis) and Min Hu (Peking University, Beijing). According to the Journal Citation Reports, the journal has a 2021 impact factor of 4.586.

References

External links

Multidisciplinary scientific journals
Physics journals
Chemistry journals
Engineering journals
Elsevier academic journals
Publications established in 1970
English-language journals
Journals published between 13 and 25 times per year